WTWA (1240 AM) is a radio station licensed to serve Thomson, Georgia, United States.  The station is owned by Camellia City Communications, Inc. It airs an oldies music format.

WTWA was built and co-owned by Walter J. Brown of Spartanburg, SC. Brown owned and operated WORD there. Brown's partner (and general manager) in WTWA was Edgar J. Kobak, former president of the Mutual Broadcasting System (and WTWA was a Mutual affiliate from the day it signed on until the network went silent). When WTWA debuted January 10, 1948, Thomson, Georgia. was the smallest (in population) town in the USA to have a radio station. Broadcasting magazine described WTWA as "an experiment in small-station operation which may indicate whether local stations can survive in county seats of about 5,000 population."

Brown sold his interest in WTWA to Kobak in 1950. In 1953, Kobak bought the local "McDuffie Progress" newspaper, combined it with the radio station and promoted Frank Hash, the editor of the newspaper, to be WTWA's manager. Hash then bought the newspaper and radio station in 1957. In 1962, Gene Harden, WTWA's longtime manager, bought the station from Hash. In an unusual turn of events, Harden sold WTWA to its founder, Walter Brown in 1977. Brown, by then longtime owner of WSPA-AM/FM/TV in Spartanburg, had returned to radio ownership in Thomson, building WTHO-AM/FM in 1972. WTHO-AM was a daytime-only station at 1530 on the dial, inferior to WTWA's 1,000 full-time facility at 1240. Upon his purchase of WTWA, Brown sent the 1530 license to the FCC for cancellation

The station was assigned the WTWA call letters by the Federal Communications Commission. The call-sign was chosen to signify communities served by the station, standing for "Washington-Thomson-Warrenton-Area".

The station has produced such local programming as 1st National Bank News, with newscaster Lee Shepard, in 1948. Alumni of the station include veteran broadcaster Gary Bryan.

Translators
In addition to the main station, WTWA is relayed by an additional translator to widen its broadcast area.

References

External links

TWA
Oldies radio stations in the United States
Nostalgia radio in the United States
Radio stations established in 1948